Outstanding (Spanish: Sobresaliente) is a 1953 Spanish comedy film directed by Luis Ligero and starring Miguel Ligero and Rosita Yarza.

The film's sets were designed by Teddy Villalba.

Synopsis 
Juanito puts at risk the happiness of his younger brother Ricardo, whom he cares for as if he were his father.

Cast
 Valeriano Andrés
 Manuel Arbó
 Rafael Arcos
 Ricardo B. Arévalo
 Pedro Pablo Ayuso
 Julián Balbuena
 Xan das Bolas
 Josefina Carreras
 Juan Cazalilla
 Manuel R. Cuevillas
 Juan Córdoba
 Mercedes Duval
 Alfonso Estela
 José Franco  
 Victoria Herrera
 María Antonia Jiménez
 Arturo Calderón de la Barca
 Miguel Ligero
 Luis Lucas
 Manuel Luna hijo
 Juana Mansó
 José María Martín
 Pablo Muñiz 
 Encarna Paso 
 Blanca Pozas 
 Inés Pérez Indarte 
 Olimpia Raga as dance couple  
 Vicente Raga as dance couple  
 Alberto Romea 
 Carlos Rufart 
 Mary Serra 
 Ana de Siria 
 Alicia Torres 
 José María Uribarri 
 Aníbal Vela hijo 
 Rosita Yarza

References

Bibliography 
 Mario Gallina. De Gardel a Norma Aleandro: diccionario sobre figuras del cine argentino en el exterior. Ediciones Corregidor, 1999.

External links 
 

1953 comedy films
Spanish comedy films
1953 films
1950s Spanish-language films
Spanish black-and-white films
1950s Spanish films